The 2009 Finnish Figure Skating Championships took place between December 19 and 21, 2008 at the Helsingin jäähalli in Helsinki. Skaters competed in the disciplines of men's singles, ladies' singles, and ice dancing on the senior and junior levels. The results were one of the criteria used to choose the Finnish teams to the 2009 World Championships, the 2009 European Championships, and the 2009 World Junior Championships.

The senior compulsory dance was the Finnstep and the junior compulsory dance was the Paso Doble.

Senior results

Men

Ladies

Ice dancing

Junior results

Men

Ladies

Ice dancing

External links
 2009 Finnish Championships results

Finnish Figure Skating Championships
2008 in figure skating
Finnish Figure Skating Championships, 2009
Figure skating
2009 in Finnish sport